Quantum mysticism, sometimes referred pejoratively to as quantum quackery or quantum woo, is a set of metaphysical beliefs and associated practices that seek to relate consciousness, intelligence, spirituality, or mystical worldviews to the ideas of quantum mechanics and its interpretations. Quantum mysticism is criticized by non-believers with expert knowledge of quantum mechanics to be pseudoscience or quackery.

Early controversy and resolution

Olav Hammer stated that Werner Heisenberg, one of the main pioneers of the theory of quantum mechanics, was so interested in India that he got the nickname "The Buddha". "However," Hammer said, "in Heisenberg's Physics and Philosophy (1959) there is no substantial trace of quantum mysticism;" and added "In fact, Heisenberg discusses at length and endorses the decidedly non-mystical Copenhagen interpretation." Hammer also said that "Schrödinger’s studies of Hindu mysticism never compelled him to pursue the same course as quantum metaphysicists such as David Bohm or Fritjof Capra." Schrödinger's biographer, Walter J. Moore, said that Schrödinger's two interests of quantum physics and Hindu mysticism were "strangely dissociated".

There is no scientific evidence to support quantum mysticism. In "'Mysticism' in Quantum Mechanics: The Forgotten Controversy", Juan Miguel Marin discussed the controversy of such debate. One of the first arguments was started by Charles Seife. He said that consciousness was a factor in quantum processes. Another argument was by Eugene Wigner who was thought to be the original person introducing the "mind-body question". Marin argues that none of the resulting theories of Wigner's paper were relevant (2009) due to the fact that "not only was consciousness introduced hypothetically at the birth of quantum physics, but the term 'mystical' was also used by its founders, to argue in favor and against such an introduction." 

These statements later get argued against by men like Albert Einstein. Despite not affirming quantum mysticism, Einstein's theories have often been falsely believed to support mystical interpretations of quantum theory. Marin quotes Einstein saying, with regard to quantum mysticism, "No physicist believes that. Otherwise he wouldn't be a physicist." He debates several arguments about the approval of mysticism, even falsely claiming Bohr to be in support and hold a positive belief in mysticism. According to Marin, "Einstein accused Niels Bohr of mysticism" which he believes to be false while claiming that "Pauli" planted "mystical hypothesis" (2009). As a result of this blame, mysticism was given its common knowledge foundation. Marin focuses on the controversial understanding of mysticism by depicting the relations between Bohr and Einstein. Bohr tries to repeatedly clear his name and the misunderstanding but to no avail, he is at a loss. Marin states, "As early as 1927, we find Bohr rejecting the hypothesis which claims that quantum theory requires a conscious observer." Over time, Bohr gradually changes his view on this topic. "He was certainly sympathetic towards the hypothesis that understanding consciousness might require an extension of quantum theory to accommodate laws other than those of physics". Bohr never flat out states that he agrees with mysticism in the science field, but he gives indication that it may be something worth looking into and could possibly lead to breakthroughs. Another area of controversy brought about by Marin was the concept of Einstein and the "mystical aspect".

Wigner
In 1961 Eugene Wigner wrote a paper, titled "Remarks on the mind–body question", suggesting that a conscious observer played a fundamental role in quantum mechanics, a part of the von Neumann–Wigner interpretation. While his paper served as inspiration for later mystical works by others, Wigner's ideas were primarily philosophical and are not considered "in the same ballpark" as the mysticism that followed. By the late 1970s, Wigner had shifted his position and rejected the role of consciousness in quantum mechanics.

Appropriation by New Age thought
In the early 1970s New Age culture began to incorporate ideas from quantum physics, beginning with books by Arthur Koestler, Lawrence LeShan and others which suggested purported parapsychological phenomena could be explained by quantum mechanics. In this decade the Fundamental Fysiks Group emerged, a group of physicists who embraced quantum mysticism while engaging in parapsychology, Transcendental Meditation, and various New Age and Eastern mystical practices. 

Inspired in part by Wigner, Fritjof Capra, a member of the Fundamental Fysiks Group, wrote The Tao of Physics: An Exploration of the Parallels Between Modern Physics and Eastern Mysticism (1975), which espoused New Age quantum physics; the book was popular among the non-scientific public. In 1979, Gary Zukav, a non-scientist and "the most successful of Capra's followers", published The Dancing Wu Li Masters. The Fundamental Fysiks Group is said to be one of the agents responsible for the "huge amount of pseudoscientific nonsense" surrounding interpretations of quantum mechanics.

Modern usage and examples 
In contrast to the mysticism of the early 20th century, today quantum mysticism typically refers to its New Age incarnation that claims to combine ancient mysticism with quantum mechanics. Called a pseudoscience and a "hijacking" of quantum physics, it draws upon "coincidental similarities of language rather than genuine connections" to quantum mechanics. Physicist Murray Gell-Mann coined the phrase "quantum flapdoodle" to refer to the misuse and misapplication of quantum physics to other topics.

An example of such misuse is New Age guru Deepak Chopra's "quantum theory" that aging is caused by the mind, expounded in his books Quantum Healing (1989) and Ageless Body, Timeless Mind (1993). In 1998, Chopra was awarded the parody Ig Nobel Prize in the physics category for "his unique interpretation of quantum physics as it applies to life, liberty, and the pursuit of economic happiness". In 2012, Stuart Hameroff and Chopra proposed that the "quantum soul" could exist "apart from the body" and "in space-time geometry, outside the brain, distributed nonlocally".

The 2004 film What the Bleep Do We Know!? dealt with a range of New Age ideas in relation to physics. It was produced by the Ramtha School of Enlightenment, founded by J.Z. Knight, a channeler who said that her teachings were based on a discourse with a 35,000-year-old disembodied entity named Ramtha. Featuring Fundamental Fysiks Group member Fred Alan Wolf, the film misused some aspects of quantum mechanics—including the Heisenberg uncertainty principle and the observer effect—as well as biology and medicine. Numerous critics dismissed the film for its use of pseudoscience.

See also 

 Buddhism and science
 Fundamental Fysiks Group
 Interpretations of quantum mechanics
 Metaphysics
 Parapsychology
 Psi (parapsychology)
 Quantum immortality
 Quantum pseudo-telepathy
 Schrödinger's cat in popular culture
 Synchronicity
People:
 Kak, Subhash
 Wilde, Stuart
 Zajonc, Arthur

Notes

Further reading
Publications relating to quantum mysticism
Fritjof Capra, The Tao of Physics: An Exploration of the Parallels Between Modern Physics and Eastern Mysticism, Shambhala Publications, 1975
Deepak Chopra, Quantum Healing: Exploring the Frontiers of Mind/Body Medicine, 
, The Secret Physics of Coincidence: Quantum phenomena and fate – Can quantum physics explain paranormal phenomena?, 
 Patrick Grim, Philosophy of science and the occult, 
 
Lawrence LeShan, The Medium, the Mystic, and the Physicist: Toward a General Theory of the Paranormal, 2003, Helios Press, 
Jack Sarfatti, 1975, Space-Time and Beyond, with Fred Alan Wolf and Bob Toben, E. P. Dutton. 
Michael Talbot, The Holographic Universe, 
Michael Talbot, Mysticism And The New Physics, 
Michael Talbot, Beyond The Quantum, 
Evan Harris Walker, The Physics of Consciousness: The Quantum Mind and the Meaning of Life, 
Ken Wilber, Quantum Questions: Mystical Writings of the World's Great Physicists (editor), 1984, rev. ed. 2001: 
Gary Zukav, The Dancing Wu Li Masters, 1980, -
Alexander Zelitchenko,The scientist's Conversations with the Teacher. Science and Esoterics. "Conversation No.9. Resolving the scientist's Doubts, Which Resulted in a Sketch of The Physics of Subtle Matter", pp. 47ff, 2001, 

Criticism of quantum mysticism
  -- criticism from both scientific and mystical point of view
 
 Michael Shermer, "Quantum Quackery", Scientific American, January 2005 
   --  an anti-mystical point-of-view
 Victor J. Stenger, "Quantum quackery", Skeptical Inquirer, Vol. 21. No. 1, January/February 1997, pp. 37ff, criticism of the book The Self-Aware Universe by

External links

 
Mysticism
New Age
Pseudoscience